County routes in Schuyler County, New York, are signed with the Manual on Uniform Traffic Control Devices-standard yellow-on-blue pentagon route marker. Route numbers are generally assigned in a clockwise fashion, beginning in the northeastern corner of the county.

Route list

See also

County routes in New York

References

External links
Empire State Roads – Tompkins County Roads